Processus pyramidalis can refer to:
 Pyramidal process of palatine bone (processus pyramidalis ossis palatini)
 Pyramidal lobe of thyroid gland (lobus pyramidalis glandulae thyroideae) sometimes referred to as processus pyramidalis glandulae thyroideae